This is a list of the 30 present dukes in the peerages of the Kingdom of England, Kingdom of Scotland, Kingdom of Great Britain, Kingdom of Ireland, United Kingdom of Great Britain and Ireland, and the United Kingdom of Great Britain and Northern Ireland 1927 and after.  For a more complete historical listing, including extinct, dormant, abeyant, forfeit dukedoms in addition to these extant ones, see List of dukedoms in the peerages of Britain and Ireland.

In the Peerage of England, the title of duke was created 74 times (using 40 different titles: the rest were recreations). Three times a woman was created a duchess in her own right; Barbara Palmer, 1st Duchess of Cleveland, chief mistress of Charles II of England, Anne Scott, 1st Duchess of Buccleuch, wife of Charles II's eldest illegitimate son, the Duke of Monmouth, and Cecilia Underwood, Duchess of Inverness, wife of Prince Augustus Frederick, Duke of Sussex, whose marriage was in contravention of the Royal Marriages Act 1772 and therefore she was not allowed to share her husband's rank. In addition, the Dukedom of Marlborough was once inherited by a woman, the 2nd Duchess of Marlborough, through a special remainder, as happened to the Dukedom of Hamilton when it was inherited by Anne Hamilton, 3rd Duchess of Hamilton and also the royal Dukedom of Fife, which was created for the Earl Fife by Queen Victoria, on the occasion of his marriage to Louise, Princess Royal, eldest daughter of the future King Edward VII. A second dukedom of Fife was created in 1900 that could pass through the female line, which was eventually inherited by Princess Alexandra, 2nd Duchess of Fife. Out of the 74 times, 37 titles are now extinct (including the two women's), 16 titles were forfeit or surrendered, 10 were merged with the Crown, and 11 are extant (see list below). The first, Cornwall, is a title that automatically goes to the heir apparent (if and only if he is also the eldest living son of the Sovereign). One of the duchies that was merged into the Crown, Lancaster, still provides income to the sovereign. All but three of the non-royal ducal titles which became extinct did so before the 20th century (the Duke of Leeds became extinct in 1964, the Duke of Newcastle in 1988, and the Duke of Portland in 1990). The last English dukedom to be forfeit became so in 1715. The last British dukedom to become extinct was the title of Duke of Portland in 1990.

The oldest six titles – created between 1337 and 1386 – were Duke of Cornwall (1337), Duke of Lancaster (1351), Duke of Clarence (1362), Duke of York (1385), Duke of Gloucester (1385), and Duke of Ireland (1386).  The Duke of Ireland was a title used for only two years and is somewhat confusing since only a small portion of Ireland was really under the control of England in 1386; it is not to be confused with the dukedoms of the Peerage of Ireland. Clarence has not been used since 1478, when George (the brother of Edward IV) was executed for treason. (However Clarence has since been used as half of a double title, most recently until 1892 when Victoria's grandson (and son of the Prince of Wales), the Duke of Clarence and Avondale, died at the age of 28). The titles of Duke of York and the Duke of Gloucester have both become extinct more than once and been re-created as titles within the Peerage of the United Kingdom. Both titles are reserved for princes (and their descendants). The Duke of Lancaster has merged with the Crown and so is held by the monarch.
 
Besides the dukedoms of Cornwall and Lancaster, the oldest extant title is that of Duke of Norfolk, dating from 1483 (the title was first created in 1397). The Duke of Norfolk is considered the premier duke of England. The premier duke of Scotland is the Duke of Hamilton and Brandon. The premier duke of Ireland is the Duke of Leinster.

Order of precedence

The general order of precedence among dukes is:
Dukes in the Peerage of England, in order of creation
Dukes in the Peerage of Scotland, in order of creation
Dukes in the Peerage of Great Britain, in order of creation
Dukes in the Peerage of Ireland created before 1801, in order of creation
Dukes in the Peerage of the United Kingdom and dukes in the Peerage of Ireland created after 1801, in order of creation

Whilst the general order of precedence is set according to the age of the peerage, the sovereign's Grace may accord any peer higher precedence than his date of creation would warrant. The royal dukes are dukes of the United Kingdom, but rank higher in the order of precedence than the age of their titles warrants, due to their close relationship to the monarch. The Duke of Cornwall holds precedence above all dukes, royal and non-royal, and is the Duke of Rothesay, and of Cambridge.

Dukes in the peerages of Britain and Ireland

List of heirs of dukes in the peerages of the British Isles

Heirs apparent

Heirs presumptive

Dukes without heirs

See also
British nobility
Dukes in the United Kingdom
List of dukedoms in the peerages of Britain and Ireland
Royal dukedoms in the United Kingdom
 Duchies in England

Notes

References

Sources 
 Burke′s Peerage and Gentry

Dukedoms in the Peerage of Ireland
Britain and Ireland
Lists of dukes in Great Britain
Dukes
Peerages in the United Kingdom